is a national university in the city of Chiba, Japan. It offers Doctoral degrees in education as part of a coalition with Tokyo Gakugei University, Saitama University, and Yokohama National University. The university was formed in 1949 from existing educational institutions in Chiba Prefecture, and over a period of years absorbed Chiba Medical University (1923-1960), a preparatory department of the Tokyo Medical and Dental University, Chiba Normal School (1872-1951), Tokyo Polytechnic High School (1914-1951), Chiba Horticultural High School, among others. Chiba University was reincorporated in 2010 under the National University Corporation Act. Chiba University has been ranked 168th on the Asia University Rankings 2019 Top 100 by "The Times Higher Education". Its abbreviated form is Chibadai (千葉大).

Currently, Chiba University consists of nine faculties, the university library, the university hospital and other educational and research facilities. With 11,179 students in the undergraduate program, it has long been one of the largest universities in Japan. As for the graduate school, there are about 2,354 students in ten master's programs and 1,220 in nine doctoral programs.

The University's four campuses, Nishi-Chiba, Inohana, Matsudo, and Kashiwanoha are ideally located in Chiba Prefecture, an area noted for its industrial, intellectual and international achievements. Chiba University has achieved a high degree of participation in international cooperative research projects. Chiba University presently has a large body of international research scholars and students studying on its various campuses. As of 2009, there are approximately 477 international researcher and 957 international students.

Faculties and graduate schools

Faculties

Letters
The Faculty of Letters offers courses in the fields of national and international languages, literature, history, psychology, anthropology, and in the relatively new fields of cross-cultural studies, information science and theoretical linguistics.

Education
The Faculty of Education dates back to the year 1872, the year of the establishment of the modern educational system in Japan, and has the longest history in this university.

Law, Politics and Economics
The Faculty of Law, Politics and Economics is unique among Chiba University faculties in that it conducts research and education in social sciences. The Faculty consists of four Majors: Major in Law, Economics, Management and Accounting, Politics and Policy Studies. Students enrolled in one Major will take courses offered in other majors to develop comprehensive and interdisciplinary understandings of various social phenomena at hand.

Science
The Faculty of Science comprises five departments and in active in both education and research. It offers a diversity of programs ranging from introductory courses for absolute beginners, via multi-disciplinary subjects, to pioneering sciences and their applications for more advanced learners. The Faculty helps students become all-round scientists, experts and/or assets to the industry and communities.

Medicine
The history of Chiba University School of Medicine can be traced back as early as 1874, when its predecessor was founded as a private hospital by donations from the local community. In 1876 it became a prefectural institution with medical teaching facilities and was named the Chiba Public Hospital. In 1923 it became the Chiba Medical College, and was incorporated into the School of Medicine at Chiba University in 1949. Alumni from this school have contributed greatly to the progress of medicine in Japan.

Pharmaceutical Sciences
The Faculty of Pharmaceutical Sciences was founded as the Department of Pharmacy in the Medical School of the First Senior High School in 1890, and is the oldest pharmaceutical faculty among Japanese national universities. Since then, the Faculty has greatly contributed to the development of pharmaceutical sciences in Japan through education and research works. The Faculty consists of two departments: Department of Pharmacy (6 year education program) and Department of Pharmaceutical Sciences (4 year education program). The graduates from the Department of Pharmacy are qualified to take the national examination for the pharmacist's license.

Nursing
The School of Nursing offers a program leading to the Bachelor of Science in Nursing. The School also offers an RN-BSN option for registered nurses with an associate degree or diploma in nursing. Upon successful completion of the required courses, graduates are qualified to take the national licensure examinations for nurses, public health nurses, and/or midwives.

Engineering
The Faculty of Engineering consists of ten departments: Departments of Architecture, Urban Environment Systems, Design, Mechanical Engineering, Medical System Engineering, Electrical and Electronic Engineering, Nanoscience, Applied Chemistry and Biotechnology, Image Science, and Informatics and Imaging Systems. Most of the academic staff in the Faculty are also fully responsible for research and education within the two-year Master's and the three-year Doctoral Programs in the Graduate School of Engineering.

Horticulture
Graduate School of Horticulture, located on top of a scenic hill in Matsudo City, has had major academic and international contributions in horticulture and landscape science since it was founded in 1909. It is the only faculty / graduate school known by the name of horticulture among Japanese universities.

The Graduate School of Horticulture offers education and research encompassing all aspects of “Horticulture, Food and Landscape” with interdisciplinary and international perspectives. With this aim, The Graduate School of Horticulture's  teaching and research programs consists not only of natural sciences but also of social sciences and humanities, such as: cultivation, plant breeding, biotechnology of bio-resources, landscape design and engineering, human health and welfare, environmental science for sustainable cities and nature conservation, food system studies, and environmental and development economics.

The research fields of the Graduate School of Horticulture are as follows:

Bioresource Science:
 Horticultural Plant Production and Breeding
 Environmental Science for Bioproduction
 Applied Biological Chemistry

Environmental Science and Landscape Architecture: 
 Landscape Architecture
 Landscape Science
 Environment and Human Health Sciences

Food and Resource Economics 
 Food System Analysis
 Resource and Environmental Economics

Graduate schools
 Humanities and Social Sciences
 Education
 Nursing
 Social Sciences and Humanities
 Science and Technology
 Medicine
 Pharmaceutical Sciences
 Medical and Pharmaceutical Sciences
 Law School

Notable alumni 
Ai Aoki, Politician (Education)
Nobuyoshi Araki, photographer (Technology of Photograph and Printing, 1963)
 Masanobu Endō, video game designer (Engineering)
Katsuichi Honda, Journalist (Pharmaceutical Sciences)
Junichiro Ito, director of the Department of Psychiatric Rehabilitation, National Institute of Mental Health
Tomisaku Kawasaki,  pediatrician, Kawasaki disease named after him
Taku Kishimoto, anime screenwriter
 Naoshi Mizuta, video game composer (Law & Economics)
Kayoko Okubo, Comedian (Letters)
Norihisa Tamura, Politician (Minister of Health, Labor and Welfare)
Takashi Yanase, Cartoonist (Engineering)

Notes

External links

 Chiba University

 

Chiba University
Japanese national universities
1949 establishments in Japan
Educational institutions established in 1949
Buildings and structures in Chiba (city)